The 1931–32 City Cup was the thirty-fourth edition of the City Cup, a cup competition in Northern Irish football.

The tournament was won by Glentoran for the 7th time.

Group standings

References

1931–32 in Northern Ireland association football